Louis Crocq (14 January 1928 – 8 June 2022) was a French military doctor and psychiatrist who specialized in shell shock.

Biography
Crocq studied medicine and earned a doctorate in psychology in 1961. He became a military psychiatrist in 1952 and became certified in psychiatry in 1974. He was president of the military and disaster section of the World Psychiatric Association and founded the Association de langue française pour l’étude du stress et du trauma.

His publications focused on shell shock and post-traumatic stress disorder.

Louis Crocq died on 8 June 2022 at the age of 94.

Bibliography
Les surdités de la pratique militaire. Surdités par blast-injury, surdités par traumatisme sonore, surdités psychogéniques (1953)
Psychiatrie en pratique médicale courante (1972)
Informatique et psychiatrie (1976)
Les traumatismes psychiques de guerre (1999)
Gérer les grandes crises (2009)
16 leçons sur le trauma (2012)
Les blessés psychiques de la Grande Guerre (2014)

References

1928 births
2022 deaths
French military doctors
French psychiatrists
People from Asnières-sur-Seine